The 1901 Georgetown Blue and Gray football team was an American football team that represented Georgetown University as an independent during the 1901 college football season. In its second season under head coach William W. Church, the team compiled a 3–3–2 record and played its home games on Georgetown Field in Washington, D.C.

Schedule

References

Georgetown
Georgetown Hoyas football seasons
Georgetown Blue and Gray football